Roxane Petetin (born 3 October 1981) is a French former ice dancer. She began competing internationally with Matthieu Jost in the mid-1990s. They competed for three seasons on the ISU Junior Grand Prix series and placed 11th at the 2000 World Junior Championships. Petetin/Jost moved up to the senior level in the 2000–01 season. They last competed together at the 2004 European Championships, where they finished 12th. Petetin retired due to injury.

Programs 
(with Jost)

Competitive highlights 
GP: Grand Prix; JGP: Junior Grand Prix

 with Jost

References

External links 
 

1981 births
Living people
People from Chaumont, Haute-Marne
French female ice dancers
Sportspeople from Haute-Marne
21st-century French women